The WABA Champions Cup 2005 was the 8th staging of the WABA Champions Cup, the basketball club tournament of West Asia Basketball Association. The tournament was held in Amman, Jordan between March 28 and April 1. The top four teams qualify for the FIBA Asia Champions Cup 2005.

Standings

Results

References
www.goalzz.com

2005
International basketball competitions hosted by Jordan
2004–05 in Asian basketball
2004–05 in Jordanian basketball
2004–05 in Iranian basketball
2004–05 in Lebanese basketball
2005 in Syrian sport
2005 in Iraqi sport
Bask